This is a list of cricket umpires who have officiated at least one men's One Day International (ODI) match. As of October 2022, 418 umpires have officiated in an ODI match. The first ODI match took place on 5 January 1971 between Australia and England at the Melbourne Cricket Ground. The umpires for this game were Tom Brooks and Lou Rowan. In April 2019, Claire Polosak became the first woman to stand in men's ODI match, when she was one of the on-field umpires for the final of the 2019 ICC World Cricket League Division Two tournament. Three umpires, Rudi Koertzen of South Africa, Billy Bowden of New Zealand and Aleem Dar of Pakistan, have officiated in 200 or more ODI matches.

On 1 November 2020, in the second ODI between Pakistan and Zimbabwe, Pakistan's Aleem Dar stood in his 210th ODI match as an on-field umpire, surpassing South African Rudi Koertzen's record of officiating in the most ODI matches.

In-game changes
The figures include the following occasion when an on-field umpire was replaced during an ODI:
Three umpires were used for the 4th ODI between Australia and India at Canberra in 2015–16. Richard Kettleborough was injured during Australia's innings and was replaced by third umpire Paul Wilson.

References

International cricket umpires
One Day International umpires
Umpires
One Day International cricket umpires